Kaur is the most southern regency of Bengkulu Province, Indonesia, on the island of Sumatra. It has an area of 2,365.00 km² and had a population of 107,899 at the 2020 Census and 126,551 at the 2020 Census. The regency seat is at the town of Bintuhan.

Administrative districts 

The Regency is divided into fifteen districts, tabulated below with their areas and their populations at the 2010 Census and the 2020 Census. The table also includes the location of the district administrative centres, and the number of villages (totalling 192 rural desa and 3 urban kelurahan) in each district.

Note: * the number of villages includes one urban kelurahan.

References

Regencies of Bengkulu